Hayley Green may refer to:

Hayley Green, Berkshire, part of the parish of Warfield
Hayley Green, West Midlands, a suburb of Halesowen, West Midlands